Lysefjord Bridge  is a suspension bridge over the Lysefjorden in Rogaland county, Norway. The bridge connects the municipalities of Strand (on the north end of the bridge) and Sandnes (on the south end of the bridge).
  

The bridge carries Norwegian county road 13, connecting to Norwegian National Road 13 on the north end.

References

External links 

 Another photograph

Bridges in Rogaland
Bridges completed in 1997
Suspension bridges in Norway
1997 establishments in Norway
Strand, Norway
Sandnes